Myanmar Plaza is a large shopping mall in Yangon, Myanmar (Burma). The plaza consists of retail outlets, including home appliance and electronics stores, lifestyle shops, and beauty and fashion shops, and a  food court with cafes, fast food, dining and teashops. The pavilion also holds a  outlet for Marketplace, a grocery store.

History 
Myanmar Plaza was completed in 2015 and opened on 5 December 2015. It is owned by Vietnam’s Hoang Anh Gia Lai (HAGL). The Myanmar Plaza is part of the Myanmar Centre, a $440-million mixed-use development with office towers, a hotel and residential apartments.

In 2016, The Spanish-owned Meliá Yangon, a five-star hotel attached to the plaza, was completed.

In the aftermath of the 2021 Myanmar coup d'etat, Myanmar Plaza has been the target of anti-coup protesters. On 7 April 2021, a small grenade was launched inside the mall. On 25 November 2021, the mall's security team courted significant criticism after using force to break up a flash mob protest staged inside the mall. In response, protesters launched an ongoing boycott movement against the mall.

Location 
Myanmar Plaza is part of the Myanmar Centre and located on five-storey building on Kabar Aye Pagoda Road, Bahan Township, Yangon, at the intersection of Kabar Aye Pagoda Road and No.1 Industrial Road.

Events
Myanmar Plaza has a large promotion hall (inside and outside) to hold events. The center hosted the 2016 Toyota Vios official launch event in 2016.

See also 
 Yuzana Plaza

References 

Buildings and structures in Yangon
Shopping malls and markets in Myanmar
2015 establishments in Myanmar